Selenography is the fourth studio album by American post-rock band Rachel's. It was released on June 8, 1999 by Quarterstick Records.

Selenography is the scientific study of the Moon's topography.

Track listing

References

Rachel's albums
1999 albums
Quarterstick Records albums